Royal Air Force Bibury or more simply RAF Bibury is a former Royal Air Force satellite airfield located north east of Cirencester, Gloucestershire, England.

History
The airfield was built in 1939 for use as a relief landing ground for training aircraft from nearby RAF South Cerney. In the Battle of Britain the airfield was used to base detachments of fighter aircraft. Hawker Hurricanes of 87 Squadron arrived on detachment in August 1940. They were replaced by a detachment from 92 Squadron with the Supermarine Spitfire until September when the 87 Squadron detachment returned until the end of the year. During the Battle of Britain the airfield had very few buildings and a grass runway. The airfield was not used for flying after 1944 and was the base of a maintenance unit until it closed in 1945.

The following units were here at some point:
 No. 3 (Pilots) Advanced Flying Unit RAF
 No. 3 Service Flying Training School RAF
 No. 7 Maintenance Unit RAF
 No. 1539 (Beam Approach Training) Flight RAF

References

Citations

Bibliography

Royal Air Force stations in Gloucestershire
Royal Air Force stations of World War II in the United Kingdom